Yousef El-Issa (alternative: Yusuf al-‘Isa) was a Palestinian journalist. He established the Filastin newspaper with his cousin Issa El-Issa in 1911, based in his hometown of Jaffa. Filastin became one of the most prominent and long running in the country at the time, was dedicated to Arab Nationalism and the cause of the Arab Orthodox in their struggle with the Greek-Orthodox Patriarchate in Jerusalem. They were passionately opposed to Zionism and Jewish immigration to Palestine. He has been described by a researcher to be "a founder of modern journalism in Palestine".
 
Al-Muqattam, one of the most read dailies in Egypt, commented in an editorial when El-Issa was editor-in-chief (1911-1914):

See also
Falastin newspaper

References

1870 births
1948 deaths
Arab people in Mandatory Palestine
Eastern Orthodox Christians from Palestine
People from Jaffa
Palestinian journalists
Palestinian newspaper founders
Palestinian newspaper publishers (people)
Palestinian nationalists